Littledalea is a genus of Asian plants in the grass family, native to mountains in China and neighboring countries. The genus is placed in its own tribe Littledaleae within subfamily Pooideae. The isolated tribe seems to be sister to the tribes Bromeae and Triticeae.

Genus was named for British game hunter Clement St. George Royds Littledale (1851–1931) 

 Species
 Littledalea alaica (Korsh.) Petrov ex Kom. - Qinghai, Tibet, Kazakhstan, Kyrgyzstan, Tajikistan
 Littledalea przevalskyi Tzvelev - Gansu, Qinghai, Tibet
 Littledalea racemosa Keng - Qinghai, Tibet, Sichuan, Yunnan
 Littledalea tibetica Hemsl. - Tibet, Nepal, Yunnan

References

External links
 

Pooideae
Grasses of Asia
Poaceae genera